Broderick Lawrence Sargent (born September 16, 1962) is a former American football fullback in the National Football League (NFL) for the St. Louis Cardinals and Dallas Cowboys. He also was a member of the Montreal Machine in the World League of American Football (WLAF), and the Detroit Drive in the Arena Football League (AFL). He played college football at Baylor University.

Early years
Sargent attended Waxahachie High School, where he played football, basketball and track (high jump). He accepted a football scholarship from Baylor University. As a senior, he registered 286 rushing yards on 70 carries and 138 receiving yards on 8 receptions. He finished his 5-year college career with 664 rushing yards on 164 carries and one touchdown.

Professional career

St. Louis Cardinals
Sargent was signed as an undrafted free agent by the St. Louis Cardinals after the 1986 NFL Draft on May 19. He played mainly on special teams. 

In 1987, after the players went on a strike on the third week of the season, those contests were canceled (reducing the 16 game season to 15) and the NFL decided that the games would be played with replacement players. Sargent crossed the picket line to be a part of the Cardinals replacement team, that was given the mock name "Crudbirds" by the media. In the fourth game against the Washington Redskins, he posted 78 yards rushing, including 70 in the first half. He was waived on August 22, 1988.

Dallas Cowboys
In March 1989, he signed as a free agent with the Dallas Cowboys and began the season as the starting fullback (5 starts), until being passed on the depth chart by rookie Daryl Johnston. In the twelfth game against the Philadelphia Eagles, he was the team's leading rusher, including a career-long 43-yard run. On September 3, 1990, he was released after being passed on the depth chart by Tommie Agee for the backup fullback position.

Against Green Bay (12/24) he recorded a career-long 21-yard reception
and had three receptions for the game, also a career-high. His one-yard
scoring plunge against Miami (11/19) was the first touchdown of his NFL career.
The following week Sargent recorded a career-long 43-yard run against
Philadelphia and led the team in rushing.

Montreal Machine (WLAF)
In 1991, he was the starting fullback of the Montreal Machine of the World League of American Football, posting 36 carries for 83 rushing yards, 23 receptions for 209 receiving yards and one rushing touchdown.

Detroit Drive (AFL)
In 1992, he signed with the Detroit Drive of the Arena Football League and was one of the leading rushers in the league with 263 yards. The next year, he broke the league record with 20 rushing touchdowns and was one of the league's rushing leaders (261 yards), while helping the team win ArenaBowl VI.

Las Vegas Sting (AFL)
In 1995, he signed with the Las Vegas Sting of the Arena Football League. He was released on April 6.

Connecticut Coyotes (AFL)
On April 8, 1995, he was claimed off waivers by the Connecticut Coyotes of the Arena Football League. He was released before the start of the season.

References

1962 births
Living people
People from Waxahachie, Texas
Waxahachie High School alumni
Players of American football from Texas
American football fullbacks
American football linebackers
Baylor Bears football players
St. Louis Cardinals (football) players
Dallas Cowboys players
Montreal Machine players
Detroit Drive players
National Football League replacement players